Kent State University Airport  is a public airport in Stow, Ohio, United States owned by Kent State University.  The airport is located along State Route 59 (Kent Road) approximately three miles (5 km) west of the central business district of Kent.

Besides being a public airport, the Kent State University Airport is used by the College of Aeronautics and Engineering for its in-house Aeronautics program which provides flight training and other professional aeronautical training including Air Traffic Control and Airport Management studies to enrolled Kent State University students.  The airport also operates a Flight Clinic for the general public who are interested in attaining private pilot instruction. Kent State had a leading Pilot Training Bridge Program with United Express designed to help highly skilled and qualified students migrate as a pilot into the airline industry.

In early 2019 the airport received a 5 million dollar grant from FedEx for expansion, including the creation of a new aeronautics center.

Facilities and aircraft 
 Runway 1/19: 4,000 x 60 ft (1,219 x 18 m), Surface: Asphalt

For the 12-month period ending August 11, 2017, the airport had 72,500 aircraft operations, an average of 198 per day: 97% general aviation, 2% air taxi and <1% military. There are 41 aircraft based at this airport: 96% single-engine and 4% multi-engine.

References 

https://web.archive.org/web/20140826200040/http://www2.kent.edu/caest/undergraduate/aeronautics/index.cfm

External links 

Photos and Events at KSU Airport

Airports in Ohio
Kent State University
Buildings and structures in Summit County, Ohio
Transportation in Summit County, Ohio
University and college airports
Airports established in 1917
1917 establishments in Ohio